The 1942 Cork Senior Football Championship was the 54th staging of the Cork Senior Football Championship since its establishment by the Cork County Board in 1887. The draw for the opening round fixtures took place on 25 January 1942. The championship began on 12 April 1942 and ended on 27 September 1942.

St. Nicholas' entered the championship as the defending champions, however, they surrendered their title after refusing to agree to a replay with Fermoy.

On 27 September 1942, Clonakilty won the championship following a 1-08 to 1-05 defeat of Fermoy in the final. This was their second championship title overall and their first title since 1939.

Format change

A motion by Fermoy to divide the county into three divisions for the purpose of playing off the championship was passed by the County Convention. The three divisions effectively operated at local level and cut down on travel costs as a time when there was strict rationing of fuel.

Results

Division 1

Division 2

Division 3

Semi-final

Final

References

Cork Senior Football Championship